The 2010 Anaheim mayoral election was held on November 2, 2010 to elect the mayor of Anaheim, California. It saw the election of Tom Tait.

Municipal elections in California are officially non-partisan.

Results

References 

Anaheim
Mayoral elections in Anaheim, California
Anaheim